The Junior World Series of Indoor Cricket is the premier international championship of both 19 & Under boys and girls, and 16 & Under boys in Indoor Cricket. The event is organised by the sport's governing body, the World Indoor Cricket Federation (WICF) and is held every two or three years. The first Junior World Series contest was organised in New Zealand in 2003. Separate world championships are held for both open and masters age groups with the Indoor Cricket World Cup and the Masters World Series of Indoor Cricket held at similar intervals.

The World Series is contested by the members of the WICF (though member nations have not always entered teams) and beyond being an affiliated member of that body there are no formal qualifications for entry. Australia have been the most successful side having won four out of the five world titles to date.

Tournament Format
Each tournament usually follows a simple round robin format followed by finals contested by the highest placed sides. The semi finals are contested by the top four sides and more often than not the winner of each semi final progresses to the World Cup final.

The tournament usually takes place over the course of 7 to 10 days and is sometimes run in conjunction with the Masters World Series or the World Cup.

Results

See also
Indoor Cricket World Cup
Masters World Series of Indoor Cricket

Indoor cricket